Marvel Peak is a  mountain summit located in the southern tip of Banff National Park, in the Canadian Rockies of Alberta, Canada. Marvel Peak is situated in the Blue Range, three kilometers from the Continental Divide, and not visible from any road. Marvel Peak's nearest higher peak is Wonder Peak,  to the north-northwest.

History

Like so many of the mountains in and around Kananaskis Country, Marvel Peak received its name from the persons and ships involved in the 1916 Battle of Jutland, the only major sea battle of the First World War. It was named in 1917 by the Interprovincial Boundary Survey after HMS Marvel which was a destroyer involved in the Battle of Jutland. An alternate view is the name is simply descriptive, similar to Wonder Peak to the north. The mountain's name was officially adopted in 1934 by the Geographical Names Board of Canada.

Geology

Like other mountains in Banff Park, Marvel Peak is composed of sedimentary rock laid down during the Precambrian to Jurassic periods. Formed in shallow seas, this sedimentary rock was pushed east and over the top of younger rock during the Laramide orogeny.

Climate

Based on the Köppen climate classification, Marvel Peak is located in a subarctic climate zone with cold, snowy winters, and mild summers. Temperatures can drop below  with wind chill factors below . In terms of favorable weather, June through September are the best months to climb. Precipitation runoff from the mountain drains into Owl Creek and Marvel Creek, which find their way into Spray Lakes Reservoir.

See also
 Geography of Alberta

References

External links
 Weather forecast: Marvel Peak
 Parks Canada web site: Banff National Park

Two-thousanders of Alberta
Canadian Rockies
Alberta's Rockies
Mountains of Banff National Park